Henry Tulse (c. 1636 – 7 June 1697) was an English politician who sat in the House of Commons at various times between 1659 and 1679.

Tulse was the son of Henry Tulse of Hinton Admiral and his wife Margaret. His father died in 1642 and his mother subsequently married John Hildesley. He entered Wadham College, Oxford in 1653. He was also admitted at Middle Temple in 1653.

In 1659, Tulse was elected Member of Parliament for Christchurch in the Third Protectorate Parliament.  In 1660, he was elected MP for Christchurch in the Convention Parliament. He was re-elected MP for Christchurch in 1661 for the Cavalier Parliament and held the seat until 1679. 
 
Tulse was the cousin of Sir Henry Tulse, Lord Mayor of London.

References

1636 births
1697 deaths
Members of the Middle Temple
Alumni of Wadham College, Oxford
People from Christchurch, Dorset
Year of birth uncertain
English MPs 1659
English MPs 1660
English MPs 1661–1679
English MPs 1679